The 2021–22 NJIT Highlanders men's basketball team represented the New Jersey Institute of Technology in the 2021–22 NCAA Division I men's basketball season. The Highlanders, led by sixth-year head coach Brian Kennedy, played their home games at the Wellness and Events Center in Newark, New Jersey as second-year members of the America East Conference. They finished the season 11-18, 6-12 in America East Play to finish in 8th place. They lost in the quarterfinals of the America East tournament to Vermont.

Previous season
In a season limited due to the ongoing COVID-19 pandemic, the Highlanders finished the 2020–21 season 7–12, 6–10 in America East play to finish in eighth place. They lost in the first round of the America East tournament to Albany.

Roster

Schedule and results

|-
!colspan=12 style=| Regular season

|-
!colspan=12 style=| America East regular season

|-
!colspan=12 style=| America East tournament

Source

References

NJIT Highlanders men's basketball seasons
NJIT Highlanders
NJIT Highlanders men's basketball
NJIT Highlanders men's basketball